Martin Trey Brown (born August 17, 1984) is an American bare-knuckle boxer and former mixed martial artist who competes in the Lightweight division of Bare Knuckle Fighting Championship (BKFC). A professional MMA competitor from 2009 until 2019, he competed in the Lightweight and Featherweight divisions.

Bare-knuckle boxing
On February 19, 2022, Brown competed for the BKFC Lightweight Championship against Luis Palomino at BKFC: KnuckleMania 2 and lost by unanimous decision.

Mixed martial arts record

|-
| Win
| align=center| 14–5
| Johansser Paulino Hidalgo
| Decision (unanimous)
| Titan FC 57
| 
| align=center| 5
| align=center| 5:00
| Dominican Republic
|Won the Titan FC Lightweight Championship.
|-
| Win
| align=center| 13–5
| Beibit Nazarov
| Decision (unanimous)
| Titan FC 51
| 
| align=center| 5
| align=center| 5:00
| Almaty, Kazakhstan
|Won the Titan FC Interim Lightweight Championship.
|-
| Win
| align=center| 12–5
| Thomas Webb
| Decision (unanimous)
| BGMMA: Battleground MMA
| 
| align=center| 3
| align=center| 5:00
| Largo, Florida, United States
| 
|-
| Loss
| align=center| 11–5
| Raush Manfio
| Decision (unanimous)
| Titan FC 45
| 
| align=center | 3
| align=center | 5:00
| Pembroke Pines, Florida, United States
| 
|-
| Loss
| align=center| 11–4
| Desmond Green
| Decision (split)
| Titan FC 42
| 
| align=center | 3
| align=center | 5:00
| Coral Gables, Florida, United States
| 
|-
| Win
| align=center| 11–3
| Brok Weaver
| TKO (punches)
|  Titan FC 41
| 
| align=center| 2
| align=center| 0:21
| Coral Gables, Florida, United States
|Catchweight (160 lb) bout.
|-
| Win
| align=center| 10–3
| Robert Dunn
| Decision (unanimous)
| FFI: Blood & Sand 19
| 
| align=center| 3
| align=center| 5:00
| Biloxi, Mississippi, United States
| 
|-
| Win
| align=center| 9–3
| Bryan Corley
| KO (punches)
| Bellator 129
| 
| align=center| 2
| align=center| 0:42
| Council Bluffs, Iowa, United States
|Catchweight (150 lb) bout.
|-
| Win
| align=center| 8–3
| Jared Downing
| Decision (unanimous)
| Bellator 117
| 
| align=center| 3
| align=center| 5:00
| Atlantic City, New Jersey, United States
| 
|-
| Win
| align=center| 7–3
| Matt Kersse
| TKO (punches)
| Atlas Fights: Cage Rage 16
| 
| align=center| 1
| align=center| 3:22
| Vicksburg, Mississippi, United States
| 
|-
| Win
| align=center| 6–3
| Aaron Williams
| KO (punch)
| Atlas Fights: Cage Rage 14
| 
| align=center| 3
| align=center| 3:35
| Biloxi, Mississippi, United States
| 
|-
| Loss
| align=center| 5–3
| Thomas Gifford
| Submission (heel hook)
| Eglin Air Force Base - Strike Fight
| 
| align=center| 2
| align=center| 2:00
| Eglin Air Force Base, Florida, United States
| 
|-
| Win
| align=center| 5–2
| Louis Sims
| Submission (guillotine choke)
| Atlas Fights: Cage Rage 13
| 
| align=center| 1
| align=center| 1:13
| Biloxi, Mississippi, United States
| 
|-
| Win
| align=center| 4–2
| Lanny Dardar
| Decision (unanimous)
| Atlas Fights: Cage Rage 11
| 
| align=center| 3
| align=center| 5:00
| Biloxi, Mississippi, United States
| 
|-
| Win
| align=center| 3–2
| T.J. Sumler
| TKO (retirement)
| RW 12: Raging Wolf 12
| 
| align=center| 1
| align=center| 5:00
| Irving, New York, United States
| 
|-
| Loss
| align=center| 2–2
| J. P. Reese
| Decision (unanimous)
| Bellator 50
| 
| align=center| 3
| align=center| 5:00
| Hollywood, Florida, United States
| 
|-
| Win
| align=center| 2–1
| Cody Phillips
| Decision (unanimous)
| Atlas Fights: Cage Rage 8
| 
| align=center| 3
| align=center| 5:00
| Biloxi, Mississippi, United States
| 
|-
| Loss
| align=center| 1–1
| Juan Zapata
| TKO (punches)
| Psychout MMA: Clash in the Cage
| 
| align=center| 2
| align=center| 4:52
| Jackson, Mississippi, United States
| 
|-
| Win
| align=center| 1–0
| Daniel Watts
| Submission (punches)
| Psychout: MMA
| 
| align=center| 1
| align=center| 3:23
| Jackson, Mississippi, United States
|

Mixed martial arts amateur record

|-
| Win
| align=center| 1–0
| Timothy Moore
| TKO (punches)
| Psychout: MMA
| 
| align=center| 1
| align=center| 1:43
| Jackson, Mississippi, United States
|

Bare knuckle record

|-
|Loss
|align=center|3–2
|Robbie Peralta
|Decision (split)
|BKFC Fight Night: Jackson 2
|
|align=center|5
|align=center|2:00
|Jackson, Mississippi, United States
|
|-
|Loss
|align=center|3–1
|Luis Palomino
|Decision (unanimous)
|BKFC: KnuckleMania 2
|
|align=center|5
|align=center|2:00
|Miami, Florida, United States
|
|-
|Win
|align=center|3–0
|Bobby Taylor
|Decision (unanimous)
|BKFC Fight Night: Tampa
|
|align=center|5
|align=center|2:00
|Tampa, Florida, United States
|
|-
|Win
|align=center|2–0
|Zach Zane
|KO (punch)	
|BKFC: KnuckleMania
|
|align=center|2
|align=center|1:28
|Lakeland, Florida, United States
|
|-
|Win
|align=center|1–0
|Juan Pina
|TKO
|TTL 2
|
|align=center|1
|align=center|0:58
|Plant City, Florida, United States
|
|-

See also
List of male mixed martial artists

References

External links
 Martin Brown at CageRank.com
 
 
 

1984 births
American male mixed martial artists
Featherweight mixed martial artists
Lightweight mixed martial artists
Bare-knuckle boxers 
Living people